was a town located in Awa District, Chiba Prefecture, Japan.

As of October 1, 2004, the town had an estimated population of 12,527 and a density of 342 persons per km². The total area was 36.64 km².

Geography
Chikura was located at southern end of Chiba Prefecture, at the southeast extremity of Bōsō Peninsula, facing the Pacific Ocean. The town had a temperate maritime climate with hot, humid summers and mild, cool winters.

Chikura is the cable landing point for several submarine communications cables. The Chikura cable station is next to Setohama beach and lands:
 APCN 2
 C2C
 CUCN
 FASTER
 Unity

History
Asai Village was created on April 1, 1889 within Asai District, which became part of Awa District from April 1, 1897. It became a town on June 25, 1900, and was renamed Chikura on October 1, 1920. The town expanded through merger with Nanaura, Takeda, and Chitose villages in 1954.

On March 20, 2006, Chikura, along with the towns of Maruyama, Shirahama, Tomiura, Tomiyama and Wada, and the village of Miyoshi (all from Awa District), was merged to create the city of Minamibōsō.

Economy
The economy of Chikura was largely based on commercial fishing, horticulture (primarily herbs and flowers), and summer tourism.

Transportation

Highway
Japan National Route 128
Japan National Route 410

Railway
JR East – Uchibō Line
 -

Local events
The area has an annual summer festival, Chikura Matsuri. The only Shinto shrine in town is Takabe-jinja Shrine, which is devoted to the God of Cooking. Twice a year, a special ceremony is held where a fish is cleaned and prepared without being touched by the priests' hands.

The Minamibōsō Two Day Flower Walk is held every first weekend of March. In this framework, there is a close relationship and exchange program with the city of Blankenberge, Belgium, and the link Two Day March of Flanders.
In the summer the area is a very popular place as beach resort and surfing.

External links
Chikura official website(part of Minami Boso site) 
Unity Trans-Pacific cable press release

Dissolved municipalities of Chiba Prefecture
Minamibōsō